Alfred Clark can refer to:
Allie Clark (Alfred Aloysious Clark, 1923–2012), American baseballer
Alfred Corning Clark (1844–1896), American philanthropist
Alfred Clark (director) (1873–1950), Anglo-American pioneer of cinema and gramophone and collector of ceramics
Alfred Gordon Clark (1900–1958), British judge and crime writer
A. James Clark (Alfred James Clark, 1927–2015), American engineer and philanthropist
Alfred Joseph Clark (1885–1941), British pharmacologist
Joseph Alfred Clark (1872–1951), Australian politician

See also 
Alfred C. Chapin (Alfred Clark Chapin, 1848–1936), American politician